Gorakhpur district is one of the 75 districts of Uttar Pradesh state in northern India. This district is a part of the Gorakhpur division. The city of Gorakhpur, or Gorakhpur is the administrative headquarters of this district and Gorakhpur division. It borders Sant Kabir Nagar district to the west, Kushinagar and Deoria districts to the east, and Maharajganj and Azamgarh districts to the north and south.

History
The district was ceded by the Nawab of Awadh to the British East India Company in 1801. It was the location of the Chauri Chaura incident in 1922. It was earlier expanded to the north to the Nepal border but the northern part was carved out to form a new Maharajganj district in 1989.

Geography
The district lies in the Purvanchal region of Uttar Pradesh. The district is situated about 270 kilometers east of Lucknow and about 102 kilometers from Nepal Border. It is situated on the banks of the Rapti River. The district is part of Gorakhpur division.

Demographics

Religion

According to the 2011 census, Gorakhpur district has a population of 4,440,895, roughly equal to the nation of Croatia or the US state of Kentucky. This gives it a ranking of 40th in India (out of a total of 640). Its population growth rate over the decade 2001–2011 was 17.81%. Gorakhpur has a sex ratio of 944 females for every 1000 males, and a literacy rate of 70.83%. Scheduled Castes and Scheduled Tribes made up 21.08% and 0.41% of the population respectively.

Languages

The official language of the district is Hindi and additional official language is Urdu.

At the time of the 2011 Census of India, 51.31% of the population in the district identified as Bhojpuri speakers, 46.48% as Hindi speakers and 2.02% Urdu speakers.

Bhojpuri is the local language of Gorakhpur. The Bhojpuri variant of Kaithi is the indigenous script of Bhojpuri language.

Economy
The economy of the district in early 2000s was comparatively low to other major districts in the state, but since 2014 Gorakhpur district is developing on a good rate and its economy is also increased. The Gorakhpur Development Authority (GDA) handles all the development projects in this District.

Attractions
Geeta Press
Gorakhnath Temple
Gorakhpur Zoo
Chauri Chaura Incident Memorial
Ramgarh Tal Lake

Education
Gorakhpur district is home of government run universities like Deen Dayal Upadhyay Gorakhpur University, Madan Mohan Malaviya University of Technology and Maha Yogi Guru Gorakhnath Ayush University. It also has a private university named Mahayogi Gorakhnath University. It has two medical colleges named Baba Raghav Das Medical College and All India Institute of Medical Sciences, Gorakhpur.

Notable people
 

Yogi Adityanath, Indian Hindu monk and politician serving as the 21st and current Chief Minister of Uttar Pradesh.
Firaq Gorakhpuri, Urdu scholar, professor Allahabad University.
Anurag Kashyap, Indian filmmaker. 
Vidya Niwas Mishra, Hindi-Sanskrit littérateur, and a journalist.
Hari Shankar Tiwari, politician, former cabinet minister in Uttar Pradesh government and multiple time MLA from Chillupar constituency.

Villages
 

 Bhitha, Uttar Pradesh
 Mithabel
 Rithuakhor
 Bhakhara Dubey

References

External links

 

 
Districts of Uttar Pradesh